Alamance Hotel is a historic hotel located at Burlington, Alamance County, North Carolina. It was designed by architect Charles C. Hartmann and built in 1924. It is a seven-story, brick sheathed building in the Classical Revival style.  It features terra cotta ornamentation, a brick parapet, and stuccoed panels at the uppermost floor.

It was added to the National Register of Historic Places in 1984. It is located in the Downtown Burlington Historic District.

References

Hotel buildings on the National Register of Historic Places in North Carolina
Neoclassical architecture in North Carolina
Buildings and structures in Burlington, North Carolina
National Register of Historic Places in Alamance County, North Carolina
Hotel buildings completed in 1924
Individually listed contributing properties to historic districts on the National Register in North Carolina